National nature parks of Ukraine are preservation territories that are part of the Nature-Preservation Fund of Ukraine.

This category of the Nature-Preservation Fund was mainly established after the fall of the Soviet Union. There were very few parks in Ukraine and most of them were in the West.

List

See also
 Lists of Nature Reserves of Ukraine
 Nature park
 Categories of protected areas of Ukraine

References

External links

Ukraine National Parks

National parks
Ukraine
 
National parks
Institutions with the title of National in Ukraine